Dorian Dervite-Vaussoue (born 25 July 1988), known as Dorian Dervite, is a French professional footballer who plays as a defender. He is also a former French youth International having played at every youth level from U16 to U21 level.

Club career 

Dervite started his career with French club Lille but in July 2006 he moved to England to join and train in the Tottenham Hotspur youth academy. He made his competitive debut for Tottenham in the 3–1 win over Port Vale in the League Cup 4th round on 8 November 2006 where he partnered Michael Dawson in the centre of the Spurs defence.

Dervite suffered a knee injury while playing for the Spurs reserve side during a friendly match against Norwich City in early January 2007, which kept him out for several months. In January 2009, he joined Southend United on loan until the end of the season. Dervite came second in Southend's player of the season vote after a very successful loan.

He then signed for Villarreal B where he played 23 league matches, making his debut against Las Palmas. Dervite left Villarreal B to sign for English Championship side Charlton Athletic. Dervite scored his first Charlton goal in a 1–1 draw away at Leeds United. On 17 May 2013, Dervite signed a one-year contract extension. On 27 May 2014, Dervite signed for Bolton Wanderers, on a three-year contract

On 5 December 2015, he scored his first Bolton goal on his 50th league appearance for the club in a 2–3 defeat against Cardiff City at the Macron Stadium. On 9 June 2017, the club confirmed that Dervite had signed a new one-year contract with the option of an extension. On 24 May 2018, Bolton confirmed that Dervite would leave the club on 30 June when his contract came to an end.

On 23 July 2018, he signed a two-year contract with Belgian side Charleroi, with the option of a further year. In January 2019, he was loaned to NAC Breda until the end of the season.

International career 
Dervite has represented France at U-15, U-16, U-17, U-18, U-19 and U-21 levels. He has captained them on occasions. He was called up to the Under-21 squad to face Estonia and England. He was called for the international Toulon Tournament again with the U21, then against Poland and for the U21 European Championship qualifiers against Lithuania and Ukraine. he scored his first goal for France in a home draw with Poland U21 on 12 August 2009 with an 80th minute shot to make it 2–1 to France with the game ending 2–2, his last game for the Under-21s came in their 3–1 away win over Slovenia U21 on 5 September 2009.

Career statistics

Club

Honours
Bolton Wanderers
EFL League One runner-up: 2016–17

References

External links 
 Villarreal official profile
 
 
 
 

1988 births
Living people
Footballers from Lille
French footballers
Association football defenders
English Football League players
Tottenham Hotspur F.C. players
Southend United F.C. players
Villarreal CF B players
Charlton Athletic F.C. players
Bolton Wanderers F.C. players
R. Charleroi S.C. players
NAC Breda players
Doxa Katokopias FC players
K.S.V. Roeselare players
R.A.E.C. Mons players
France youth international footballers
France under-21 international footballers
French expatriate footballers
French expatriate sportspeople in Spain
Expatriate footballers in England
Expatriate footballers in Spain
French expatriate sportspeople in England
Expatriate footballers in Belgium
Belgian Pro League players
Cypriot First Division players
Eredivisie players
Expatriate footballers in the Netherlands
Expatriate footballers in Cyprus